Tarik Bendamou is a Moroccan footballer. He usually plays as forward. Bendamou is currently attached to Moghreb Tétouan.

Bendamou played for Morocco at the 2005 FIFA World Youth Championship in the Netherlands.

References 

1985 births
Living people
Moroccan footballers
Footballers from Casablanca
Morocco under-20 international footballers
Moroccan expatriate footballers
Raja CA players
Moghreb Tétouan players
Kawkab Marrakech players
R. Charleroi S.C. players
Expatriate footballers in Belgium
Moroccan expatriate sportspeople in Belgium
Association football forwards